Sts Stephen's College was an educational establishment for girls run by the Community of St John Baptist, an Anglican convent of Augustinian nuns in Clewer (Windsor, Berkshire) from 1867. The college took gentlemen's daughters, clergymen's daughters (with a discount on fees), and student teachers.

St Stephen's moved to Folkestone in 1919, and evacuated to Taplow during World War II. The buildings in Folkestone were eventually acquired by Folkestone School for Girls. After the war St Stephen's College was re-established in Broadstairs. It closed in 1991.

Timeline

Literature
 Jenny Balston, The Story of St. Stephen's College (1994) 
 Valerie Bonham, A Joyous Service: The Clewer Sisters and Their Work (2012)

References

External links
 St Stephen's College Broadstairs, organisation for former students.

Girls' schools in Kent
Girls' schools in Berkshire
Broadstairs
Defunct Church of England schools
Educational institutions established in 1874
Educational institutions disestablished in 1991
1874 establishments in England